Paul Tonkinson (born 1 August 1969) is a British comedian, radio presenter and television personality, best known for his presenting work on The Big Breakfast and The Sunday Show.

He was winner of the 1992 Time Out New Act of the Year Award and was Time Out Stand Up Comic of the Year in 1997.

Personal life
He is a supporter of Manchester United. He is a former pupil of Scalby School.

Career

Comedy
Tonkinson has been a regular on the UK comedy circuit for over fifteen years, playing both public gigs and corporate events, and regularly taking shows to the Edinburgh Festival.

Paul is also regularly booked by the UK Armed Forces, and was the first comic to perform in Iraq after the war officially ended.

He has won two Time Out Comedy Awards.

He went on tour with Michael McIntyre in 2015, for his "Happy & Glorious" tour.

Television
Television credits include:

For BBC: Stand Up for the Homeless, The Stand Up Show, The Sunday Show, Comic Relief does Fame Academy, EastEnders Revealed, Liquid News, Good Evening Rockall, Michael McIntyre's Comedy Roadshow.

For Channel 4: The Big Breakfast, Take the Mike, Pop Gun, Top Ten, Dicing With Debt.

For ITV: Stand Up, Live at Jongleurs, Raw Soap and Raw Soap II.

For Sky1: The Film Show, Lorraine, Spend It Like Beckham

Others: Live from the Comedy Store (Channel 5), MTV Hot (MTV), Hey DJ (UK Play)

Radio
His early radio career included The Paul Tonkinson Show on London Live, as well as contributions to various Radio 4 comedy programmes, including Loose Ends and Weekending. He was also featured on Radio 4's Live From the Comedy Store.

He became the inaugural Breakfast Show presenter on Xfm Manchester upon launch on 15 March 2006, before moving to Xfm London in 2007. There he initially presented a variety of daytime shows to become familiar to listeners, before taking over the Drivetime slot from Richard Bacon. Following the sudden departure of Lauren Laverne from the Breakfast Show in April 2007, producers called on his experience in Manchester and asked him to step in. This was only a stop-gap solution, however, as he decided to focus on returning to the London stand-up circuit.

He most recently presented the syndicated Saturday lunchtime show, a slot previously occupied by Lauren Laverne, Adam & Joe, and Ricky Gervais/Stephen Merchant, before leaving radio work completely to focus on stand-up comedy.

Podcasts 
As a fan of Man Utd he co-presented podcast ManYoo Redcast with fellow-fan Eddie Nestor. He also participates in the Running Commentary running podcast along with Rob Deering.

Writing 
In January 2020 his first book, 26.2 Miles to Happiness: A Comedian’s Tale of Running, Red Wine and Redemption was published by Bloomsbury Sport.

Accolades

References

External links
 Official website

 

1969 births
Living people
Comedians from Yorkshire
English male comedians
People from Scarborough, North Yorkshire